Azra Mohyeddin (born 1970) is a Pakistani actress. She is known for her roles in dramas Tum Kon Piya, Do Qadam Door Thay, Yeh Raha Dil, Sanwari, Fasiq and Mohabbat Daagh Ki Soorat.

Early life
Azra was born in 1970 in Lahore, Pakistan. She completed her studies from University of Lahore.

Career
Azra made her debut as actress in 1990 on PTV. She was noted for her roles in dramas Kuch Pyar Ka Pagalpan, Jia Na Jaye, Rehaai, Mujhe Khuda Pe Yaqeen Hai, and Mirat-ul-Uroos. Then she appeared in dramas Khafa Khafa Zindagi, Tum Kon Piya, Do Qadam Door Thay, Aadat, Shanakht and Gohar-e-Nayab. Since then she appeared in dramas Ramz-e-Ishq, Mohabbat Daagh Ki Soorat, Fasiq and she also appeared in movie Na Band Na Baraati.

Personal life
Azra married British-Pakistani actor, producer and director Zia Mohyeddin in 1994. She has one daughter named Alia Mohyeddin.

Filmography

Television

Telefilm

Film

References

External links
 
 
 

1970 births
Living people
20th-century Pakistani actresses
Pakistani television actresses
21st-century Pakistani actresses
Pakistani film actresses
Singers from Lahore
20th-century Pakistani women singers
Pakistani women singers
Urdu-language singers
21st-century Pakistani women singers